Patrick James Grieshaber (born 24 November 1996) is an English cricketer who most recently played for Gloucestershire and made his first-class debut as a righthanded batsman and wicketkeeper in 2014. On 24 July 2016 he made his List A debut against Sussex in the 2016 Royal London One-Day Cup.

Grieshaber was released by Gloucestershire at the end of the 2017 season.

References

External links
 

1996 births
Living people
English cricketers
Gloucestershire cricketers
Wiltshire cricketers
Sportspeople from Bath, Somerset
English cricketers of the 21st century
Wicket-keepers